Abdullah Sultan (born 14 March 1973) is an Emirati swimmer. He competed in four events at the 1992 Summer Olympics.

References

1973 births
Living people
Emirati male swimmers
Olympic swimmers of the United Arab Emirates
Swimmers at the 1992 Summer Olympics
Place of birth missing (living people)